Luis Miguel Sánchez Benítez (born 5 May 1992), known as Luismi, is a Spanish professional footballer who plays for Real Oviedo as a defensive midfielder.

Club career

Sevilla
Born in Puerto Serrano, Cádiz, Andalusia, Luismi graduated from Sevilla FC's youth setup, making his debut as a senior with the C side in Tercera División. In July 2012, he signed his first professional contract, also being promoted to the reserves in Segunda División B.

On 11 November 2012, Luismi broke two bones in his skull in the dying minutes of a 1–0 home win over Real Jaén, only returning to action on 31 March of the following year, against the same club. On 1 February 2014, he was called up by manager Unai Emery for a La Liga match against Málaga CF as a replacement for Cardiff City-bound Cala, also being selected to the game against UD Almería on 8 March but remaining on the bench on both occasions.

Luismi penned a new two-year deal with the Andalusians on 3 July 2014, being also an unused substitute in the 2014 UEFA Super Cup 2–0 loss to Real Madrid at Cardiff City Stadium on 12 August. He made his first-team – and top division – debut on 23 August, replacing Vicente Iborra in the 80th minute of a 1–1 home draw against Valencia CF.

On 30 July 2015, Luismi agreed to an extension, being definitely promoted to the main squad and being assigned the number 16. The jersey, worn by Antonio Puerta when he died playing for Sevilla in 2007, was only to be given to products of the club's academy from that moment onwards; halfway through the campaign, however, he was stripped of the number when it was controversially handed to Argentine Federico Fazio.

Valladolid
After turning down an offer to play for the reserves in Segunda División, Luismi signed a two-year contract at Real Valladolid on 29 June 2016. On 29 December, having been rarely used, he was loaned to Gimnàstic de Tarragona also of the second tier. He scored in his second appearance for the latter on 14 January 2017, opening a 1–1 draw at UCAM Murcia CF.

Luismi returned to the Estadio José Zorrilla ahead of 2017–18, being a regular starter in an eventual top-flight promotion. On 15 January 2020, however, after failing to feature in any league matches over two seasons (due to injury), he was loaned to Real Oviedo of division two until June.

Elche and Oviedo
On 25 September 2020, Luismi agreed to a two-year contract with Elche CF, recently promoted to the top tier. On 16 August of the following year, he returned to Oviedo as a free agent on a two-year deal.

Career statistics

Club

References

External links

1992 births
Living people
People from Sierra de Cádiz
Sportspeople from the Province of Cádiz
Spanish footballers
Footballers from Andalusia
Association football midfielders
La Liga players
Segunda División players
Segunda División B players
Tercera División players
Sevilla FC C players
Sevilla Atlético players
Sevilla FC players
Real Valladolid players
Gimnàstic de Tarragona footballers
Real Oviedo players
Elche CF players